Strontium chlorate is a chemical compound, with the formula Sr(ClO3)2.  It is a strong oxidizing agent.

Preparation
Strontium chlorate is created by warming a solution of strontium hydroxide, and adding chlorine to it, which subsequent crystallization. Chlorine has no action on dry Sr(OH)2, but it converts the hydrate (Sr(OH)2·8H2O) into the chloride and chlorate, with a small quantity of strontium hypochlorite also being produced.

References

Chlorates
Strontium compounds